Helmond is the main railway station in Helmond, Netherlands. The station opened on 1 July 1866 and is on the Venlo–Eindhoven railway. The station has 2 platforms. Train services are operated by Nederlandse Spoorwegen.

The station building from 1987 was demolished in 2013. A new station building including lifts, a new pedestrian and cycle bridge and new cycle parking facilities has been built, partly opened in February 2014. A new bus station and tunnel opened later in 2014.

Train services
The following services calls at Helmond:
2x per hour intercity services The Hague - Rotterdam - Breda - Eindhoven - Venlo
2x per hour local services (stoptrein) Nijmegen - 's-Hertogenbosch - Eindhoven - Deurne

Bus services

External links
NS website 
Dutch Public Transport journey planner 

Railway stations in Helmond
Railway stations opened in 1866
Railway stations on the Staatslijn E
1866 establishments in the Netherlands
Railway stations in the Netherlands opened in the 19th century